Reg Garvin (19 September 1912 – 1 December 1994) was an Australian rules footballer who played with St Kilda in the VFL. Garvin was a quick, tenacious, powerful, hard-working and dynamic centre half-forward in his prime. 

Originally from Newtown in NSW, Garvin had already represented his state at interstate football 12 times by the time he arrived at St Kilda. 

A follower, he finished equal 4th in the 1941 Brownlow Medal and won the first of his two St Kilda best and fairest awards, the other coming in 1944. 

For the 1942 and 1943 seasons Garvin was captain-coach. After leaving St Kilda in 1946 he joined Prahran in the VFA where he finished his career in 1948.

References

External links

1912 births
1994 deaths
St Kilda Football Club players
St Kilda Football Club coaches
Trevor Barker Award winners
Prahran Football Club players
Newtown Australian Football Club players
Australian rules footballers from New South Wales